Sinibaldi may refer to:

Alejandro M. Sinibaldi (1825–1896), acting President of Guatemala from April 2 to April 5, 1885
Bartolomeo Sinibaldi (1469 – c. 1523), sculptor of the Italian Renaissance
Giovanni Benedetto Sinibaldi -17th century physician writing on human sexuality
Guittoncino Sinibaldi (1270–1336/37), an Italian jurist and poet
Marino Sinibaldi, Italian journalist and literary critic
Pierre Sinibaldi (born 1924), French former football player and manager
Raffaele Sinibaldi (c. 1504/1505 – c. 1566/1567), sculptor and architect of the Italian Renaissance, apprentice of Michelangelo

See also
Sinibaldi (typeface) owned by Nebiolo Printech